Isaiah Ghele Sakpo (12 October 1912 – 2 August 1993) was a Nigerian Christian clergyman, evangelist, and writer. Regarded as one of the pioneering fathers of Christianity in Nigeria, he once served as Lagos, Western/Northern Areas (LAWNA) Territorial chairman and Vice-President of The Apostolic Church Nigeria.

References

External links
Isaiah Sakpo at Dictionary of African Christian Biography

1912 births
1993 deaths
Nigerian Christian writers
Nigerian Christian clergy
People from Delta State